Zuwaira Gambo is the Commissioner for Women Affairs and Social Development, Borno State.

Early life and education 
She was born in a town called Kwaya Kusar in Borno State where she obtain her primary education, then to Federal Government Girls College, Benin, then to Bayero University Kano for her first Degree in Mass communication, and a second degree in public administration from University of Calabar.

Career 
She work with the Department of Federal University of Technology, Minna as Editor, then with Daily Times Group as a writer and Editor, she was made Secretary of defence appointed by previous Inspector General of Police Alhaji Ibrahim Coomassie.

References

External links 
 Borno State Ministry of Women Affairs and Social Delopement on Twitter

Nigerian women in politics
People from Borno State
Living people
Bayero University Kano alumni
Year of birth missing (living people)